Adolph Eduard Grube (18 May 1812, in Königsberg – 23 June 1880, in Breslau) was a German zoologist.

Adolph Eduard Grube, an able worker in many animal groups, was mainly interested in Polychaetes. In 1837 he defended his thesis at the University of Königsberg (then in Prussia). From 1843-1856 he was Professor of Zoology in the Universität Dorpat (then in Livonia)  then at the Universität Breslau (now the University of Wrocław). He was one of the early scientific explorers of the Adriatic Sea.

Works
Partial list
1850. "Die Familien der Anneliden". Archiv für Naturgeschichte Berlin, 16(1): 249–364
1866 "Beschreibungen neuer von der Novara-Expedition mitgebrachter Anneliden und einer neuen landplanarie". Verhandlungen der kaiserlich-königlichen zoologisch-botanischen Gesellschaft in Wien 16: 173–184.
1866 "Eine neue Annelida, zunächst einer nordischen, in der Nähe der Ophelien und  Scalibregmen zu stellenden Annelide, Euzonus arcticus". Jahresbericht der Schlesischen Gesellschaft für vaterländische Kultur 43: 64–65.
1866 "Neue Anneliden aus den Gattungen Eunice, Hesione, Lamprophaes, und Travisia". Jahresbericht der Schlesischen Gesellschaft für vaterländische Kultur 44: 64-66.
1866 "Resultate einer Revision der Euniceen". Jahresbericht der Schlesischen Gesellschaft für vaterländische Kultur 44: 66–68.
1872. "Über die Gattung Lycastis und ein par neue Arten derselben". Jahres-Bericht Schleis. Gesell. 49:47–48.

External links
EOL Encyclopedia of Life Taxa described by Adolph Eduard Grube. Type Grube into search box.
World Register of Marine Species Full bibliography (Via literature)
Biographical Dictionary of Silesian Naturalists: Adolph Eduard Grube (1812–1880). In Polish

References

19th-century German zoologists
German arachnologists
1812 births
1880 deaths